83 Leonis, abbreviated 83 Leo, is a binary star system approximately 59 light-years away in the constellation of Leo (the Lion).  The primary star of the system is a cool orange subgiant star, while the secondary star is an orange dwarf star.  The two stars are separated by at least 515 astronomical units from each other.  Both stars are presumed to be cooler than the Sun.

In 2005, an extrasolar planet was confirmed to be orbiting the secondary star within the system.

Stellar system 

The primary component, 83 Leonis A, is a 6th magnitude star. It is not visible to the unaided eye, but easily visible with small binoculars. The star is classified as a subgiant, meaning that it has ceased fusing hydrogen in its core and started to evolve towards red gianthood.

The secondary component, 83 Leonis B, is an 8th magnitude orange dwarf, somewhat less massive (0.88 MSun), smaller and cooler than the Sun. It is visible only with binoculars or better equipment. Components A and B share common proper motion, which confirms them as a physical pair. The projected separation between the stars is 515 AU, but the true separation may be much higher.

There is yet another, magnitude 14.4 component listed in the Washington Double Star Catalog. However, this star is moving into a different direction and is therefore not a true member of the 83 Leonis system.

Planetary system 
Planet 83 Leonis Bb was discovered in Jan 2005 by the California and Carnegie Planet Search team, who use the radial velocity method to detect planets. The planet's minimum mass is less than half of the mass of Saturn. It orbits very close to the star, completing one orbit in about 17 days.

In 2010, a second planet, 83 Leonis Bc, was claimed, but was found to be a false positive in 2016.

See also 
 16 Cygni
 30 Arietis

References

External links 
 
 

Binary stars
Leonis, 83
099491
055846
4414
0429
Leo (constellation)
K-type main-sequence stars
K-type subgiants
Planetary systems with one confirmed planet
Durchmusterung objects